Pocket Full of Gold is the fourth studio album from American country music artist, Vince Gill. It was released in 1991 on MCA Nashville. It features the singles "Pocket Full of Gold," "Liza Jane," "Look at Us" and "Take Your Memory with You."

Track listing

Production 
 Producer – Tony Brown
 Recorded and Mixed by John Guess
 Overdubs recorded by John Guess and Marty Williams
 Recorded at Studio 6 (Nashville, Tennessee).
 Digital Editing – Milan Bogdan
 Mastered by Glenn Meadows
 Mixed and Mastered at Masterfonics (Nashville, Tennessee).
 Project Coordinator – Jessie Noble
 Art Direction and Design – Katherine DeVault
 Photography – Jim McGuire

Personnel 
As listed in the liner notes.
 Vince Gill – lead vocals, electric guitar (1, 3, 5, 6, 8, 9), backing vocals (2, 4, 5, 7, 8, 9)
 Barry Beckett – acoustic piano (1, 2, 4, 6, 9)
 Hargus "Pig" Robbins – acoustic piano (2, 3, 5, 7)
 Pete Wasner – keyboards (4-7, 9, 10)
 Mac McAnally – acoustic guitar
 Billy Joe Walker Jr. – electric guitar (1, 2, 4, 6, 9)
 Larry Byrom – electric guitar (3, 5, 7, 10)
 Richard Bennett – electric guitar (10)
 John Hughey – steel guitar (1, 3, 4, 5, 7, 8, 9)
 Willie Weeks – bass guitar (1, 2, 4, 6, 9)
 Michael Rhodes – bass guitar (3, 5, 7, 8, 10)
 Eddie Bayers – drums (1, 2, 4, 6, 9)
 Larrie Londin – drums (3, 5, 7, 8, 10)
 Andrea Zonn – fiddle (1, 2, 3, 5-8, 10), backing vocals (2, 5, 7)
 Herb Pedersen – backing vocals (1, 3, 10)
 Patty Loveless – backing vocals (4)
 Billy Thomas – backing vocals (6, 9)
 Tony King – backing vocals (8)

Charts

Weekly charts

Year-end charts

References
 

1991 albums
Vince Gill albums
MCA Records albums
Albums produced by Tony Brown (record producer)